NK Olimpija is a Croatian football club based in the city of Osijek.

 
Football clubs in Croatia
Football clubs in Osijek-Baranja County
Sport in Osijek
Association football clubs established in 1923
1923 establishments in Croatia